Remembrance Day (Sinhala: ජාතික රණවිරු සැමරුම් උළෙල Jāthika Raṇaviru Sæmarum Uḷela) also known as the National War heroes commemoration day in Sri Lanka, marks the capitulation of the Liberation Tigers of Tamil Eelam (LTTE) and the end to the Sri Lankan Civil War on 18 May 2009. The day is a war heroes commemoration day as well as a remembrance day for civilians who died in the war from both sides. The celebrations are marked by speeches and a moment of silence. From its inception, under President Mahinda Rajapaksa, in 2010 the day was known as Victory Day and originally included a military parade, but in 2015 the day was renamed Remembrance Day by President Maithripala Sirisena.

History
The Sri Lankan Civil War was an armed conflict fought between the Liberation Tigers of Tamil Eelam (LTTE, aka Tamil Tigers) and the Government of Sri Lanka. With the end to the war, 18 May 2009 marked a day of celebration around the island. The celebrations of 1st anniversary were presided over by President Mahinda Rajapaksa, whose government won the war. The celebrations were commemorated as Victory Day, a celebration of the triumph of the armed forces against terrorism in the country, and continued under the same name until 2015. The newly elected President Maithripala Sirisena renamed the day to Remembrance Day to "mark the sacrifices made by all those, who irrespective of their ethnicity, safeguarded the unity and territorial integrity of the country". The day also recognises all civilians who died in the war. The day is a step towards the reconciliation between all communities in the country.

Commemorations for the Liberation Tigers of Tamil Eelam are not permitted.

Anniversaries

See also
 National War Memorial, Colombo
 Mullivaikkal Remembrance Day

References

May observances
Observances honoring victims of war
Sri Lankan Civil War
Victory days
Sri Lankan historical anniversaries